NGC 3937 is an elliptical or a lenticular galaxy located about 310 million light-years away in the constellation Leo. It was discovered by astronomer William Herschel on April 27, 1785 and is classified as a radio galaxy.

NGC 3937 Group
NGC 3937 is the brightest member of the NGC 3937 Group, which is part of the Coma Supercluster. The group has a velocity dispersion of 306 km/s. Other members of the group are NGC 3910, NGC 3929, NGC 3940, NGC 3943, NGC 3947, NGC 3954, with NGC 3919 having an uncertain membership.

See also
List of NGC objects (3001–4000)

References

External links

3937
037219
Leo (constellation)
Astronomical objects discovered in 1785
Lenticular galaxies
06851
Elliptical galaxies
Radio galaxies
NGC 3937 Group